Ghost Guns is a 1944 American Western film directed by Lambert Hillyer. This is the thirteenth film in the "Marshal Nevada Jack McKenzie" series, and stars Johnny Mack Brown as Jack McKenzie and Raymond Hatton as his sidekick Sandy Hopkins, with Evelyn Finley, Riley Hill and Ernie Adams.

Cast
Johnny Mack Brown as Marshal Nevada Jack McKenzie 
Raymond Hatton as Marshal Sandy Hopkins 
Evelyn Finley as Ann Jordan 
Riley Hill as Ted Connors 
Ernie Adams as Doc Edwards 
Sarah Padden as Aunt Sally 
Jack Ingram as Waco - Henchman 
Tom Quinn as Stringer - Henchman 
Frank LaRue as Judge Kelbro 
John Merton as Matson 
Steve Clark as Steve 
Marshall Reed as Blackjack - Henchman 
George Morrell as Station Agent

References

Bibliography
Martin, Len D. The Allied Artists Checklist: The Feature Films and Short Subjects of Allied Artists Pictures Corporation, 1947-1978. McFarland & Company, 1993.

External links

1944 films
1944 Western (genre) films
American Western (genre) films
Films directed by Lambert Hillyer
Monogram Pictures films
American black-and-white films
1940s English-language films
1940s American films